The 1985 DFB-Pokal Final decided the winner of the 1984–85 DFB-Pokal, the 42nd season of Germany's premier knockout football cup competition. It was played on 26 May 1985 at the Olympiastadion in West Berlin. Bayer Uerdingen won the match 2–1 against Bayern Munich to claim their first cup title. This was Bayern's first cup final loss in their eighth final.

This match was the first time since 1942 that the cup final was held at the Olympiastadion, where it has taken place every year since.

Route to the final
The DFB-Pokal began with 64 teams in a single-elimination knockout cup competition. There were a total of five rounds leading up to the final. Teams were drawn against each other, and the winner after 90 minutes would advance. If still tied, 30 minutes of extra time was played. If the score was still level, a replay would take place at the original away team's stadium. If still level after 90 minutes, 30 minutes of extra time was played. If the score was still level, a drawing of lots would decide who would advance to the next round.

Note: In all results below, the score of the finalist is given first (H: home; A: away).

Match

Details

References

External links
 Match report at kicker.de 
 Match report at WorldFootball.net
 Match report at Fussballdaten.de 

KFC Uerdingen 05 matches
FC Bayern Munich matches
1984–85 in German football cups
1985
1980s in West Berlin
Football competitions in Berlin
May 1985 sports events in Europe
Sports competitions in West Berlin